Live at the Star Club is a 1964 live album by  rock and roll pianist and singer Jerry Lee Lewis, accompanied by the Nashville Teens. The album was recorded at the Star-Club in Hamburg, West Germany on April 5, 1964. It is regarded by many music journalists as one of the greatest rock and roll albums ever, noted for its hard-hitting energy and Lewis' wild stage presence.

Recording

Live at the Star Club was produced by Siggi Loch, who was head of the jazz department at Philips Records.  In Joe Bonomo's book Lost and Found, Loch states that "...I realized that there were all of these young, mainly British, bands who were playing Chuck Berry and other white American rock & rollers, their big heroes...And I went to the owner and made a proposal to start recording bands at the Star-Club, which I did."  According to Loch the recording setup was uncomplicated, with microphones placed as close to the instruments as possible with a stereo mike placed in the audience to capture the ambience. The results were sonically astonishing, with Bonomo observing that "Detractors complain of the album's crashing noisiness, the lack of subtlety with which Jerry Lee revisits the songs, the fact that the piano is mixed too loudly, but what is certain is that Siggi Loch on this spring evening captured something brutally honest about the Killer, about the primal and timeless center of the very best rock & roll..."

Sixteen songs were recorded over two sets, the first set comprising "Down The Line," "You Win Again," "High School Confidential," "Your Cheatin' Heart," "Great Balls of Fire," "What'd I Say (Parts 1 & 2) and "Mean Woman Blues." The second set featured "Good Golly Miss Molly," "Matchbox," "Money," "Whole Lotta Shakin' Goin' On," "Lewis Boogie," "Hound Dog," "Long Tall Sally" and "I'm On Fire." "Down The Line," which was omitted on the original LP due to a sound fault at the beginning, was released on the French Mercury single Les Rois du Rock, Vol. 8 : Jerry Lee Lewis and included on later CD and LP releases from Bear Family Records. The tapes for "You Win Again" and his current single "I'm On Fire" are believed to have been lost.

For decades the album was available only in Europe due to legal constraints.  In 2014, Lewis told biographer Rick Bragg "Oh, man, that was a big monster record" but that the record company "never paid me a penny."  Speaking to Patrick Doyle of Rolling Stone in 2014, Lewis remained proud that he "stuck with rock & roll when the rest of them didn't, I kept the ball rollin' with that."

Reception
Live at the Star Club, Hamburg is generally regarded as one of the greatest live rock and roll albums ever made.  Recorded during his "wilderness years" following the fallout surrounding his 1958 marriage to his thirteen-year-old first cousin once removed Myra, the album showcases Lewis's phenomenal skills as a pianist and singer, which had been honed by relentless touring. He had played at Deutschlandhalle in Berlin the night before. In a 5-out-of-5 stars review, Milo Miles raved in Rolling Stone that "Live At The Star Club, Hamburg is not an album, it's a crime scene: Jerry Lee Lewis slaughters his rivals in a thirteen-song set that feels like one long convulsion. Recorded April 5th, 1964, this is the earliest and most feral of Lewis' concert releases from his wilderness years ...".  Q Magazine commented "This might be the most exciting performance ever recorded...". The album was included in Mojo's "The 67 Lost Albums You Must Own!" - "[A]n unbelievably seismic document of rock 'n' roll so demonic and primal it can barely keep its stage suit on.... It's up there with James Brown's great live albums."
 
AllMusic said of the album: "Words cannot describe — cannot contain — the performance captured on Live at the Star Club, Hamburg, an album that contains the very essence of rock & roll...Live at the Star Club is extraordinary - the purest, hardest rock & roll ever committed to record...He sounds possessed, hitting the keys so hard it sounds like they'll break, and rocking harder than anybody had before or since. Compared to this, thrash metal sounds tame, the Stooges sound constrained, hardcore punk seems neutered, and the Sex Pistols sound like wimps. Rock & roll is about the fire in the performance, and nothing sounds as fiery as this; nothing hits as hard or sounds as loud, either. It is no stretch to call this the greatest live album ever, nor is it a stretch to call it the greatest rock & roll album ever recorded. Even so, words can't describe the music here — it truly has to be heard to be believed."

Joe Bonomo calls "Mean Woman Blues", the opening number on the album, as "nothing short of a concert in itself".  Author Colin Escott describes Lewis's performance of the Hank Williams classic "Your Cheatin' Heart" as a one-man tour-de-force, "a stunning fusion of everything that was Jerry Lee Lewis.  The bluesy piano licks thrown into the middle of the stone hillbilly classic and a vocal of scorching intensity." "  In the 2014 book Jerry Lee Lewis: His Own Story Rick Bragg marvels that on Live at the Star Club, Hamburg, the piano "sounds like its breaking at times, like he is playing more with a tack hammer than flesh and blood" and deems it "one of the grittiest, most spectacular pieces of recorded music ever made."

Retrospective
In 1998, Mojo included Live at the Star Club on their list of the best 20 live albums of all time. In 2003, the Digital Dream Door included the album at number 4 on their list of the greatest live albums of all time. In 2011, Goldmine included Live at the Star Club on their list of the best 13 live albums of all time. In 2015, the NME included the album at number 34 on their list of the greatest live albums of all time. Also in 2015, Rolling Stone included the album at number 16 on their list. In 2020, The Telegraph included it at number 2 on their list of the best live albums of all time. Also in 2020, The Independent included it at number 4 on their list of the greatest live albums of all time.

Chord company praised the sound quality, saying the drums were well recorded.

Track listing
Side A

Side B

1989 Re-issue

To play the songs in the order they were performed, the sequence is 14–2–10–7–5–6–1, 8–4–3–13–9–11–12.

Personnel
Credits for Live at the Star Club, Hamburg adapted from AllMusic.

Musicians
 Jerry Lee Lewis – piano, vocals
The Nashville Teens
 Johnny Allen – guitar 
 Pete Shannon Harris – bass 
 Barry Jenkins – drums

Production personnel
 Sigfried Loch – producer
 Ingrid Buhring – photography 
 Peter Van Raay – photography 
 Richard Weize – photography, reissue producer 
 Bob Jones – mastering

References

Bibliography
Joe Bonomo, Jerry Lee Lewis: Lost and Found, Continuum Books, 2009.

External links 

Live at the Star Club, Hamburg (Adobe Flash) at Radio3Net (streamed copy where licensed)
 Live at the Star Club, Hamburg at Discogs

Jerry Lee Lewis albums
1964 live albums
Philips Records live albums